Brontë Country is a name given to an area of south Pennine hills west of Bradford in West Yorkshire, England. The name comes from the Brontë sisters, who wrote such literary classics as Jane Eyre (Charlotte Brontë), Wuthering Heights (Emily Brontë), and The Tenant of Wildfell Hall (Anne Brontë) while living in the area.

Geology
The geology of the Brontë country is mainly gritstone.

Points of interest
The area includes the village of Haworth, where the Brontë sisters lived, and where the Brontë Parsonage Museum is located today.  Top Withens is said to have been the inspiration for Wuthering Heights. Ponden Hall, which located about half a mile outside Stanbury, is believed to inspire at least two buildings in Brontës' novels: Thrushcross Grange in Wuthering Heights and the eponymous mansion in The Tenant of Wildfell Hall. Thornton, on the outskirts of Bradford, is the birthplace of the Brontë sisters and their brother Branwell (their father was rector of Thornton church). The house where they were born still exists as the Brontë Birthplace and is open to visitors by appointment. It is located on Market Street in the centre of the village 

Other places of interest from the Brontë sisters' novels include Oakwell Hall (Fieldhead in Shirley), Red House (Briarmains in Shirley), and Gawthorpe Hall and Wycoller Hall (Ferndean Manor in Jane Eyre).

In media and culture
The film Brontë Country: The Story of the Emily, Charlotte & Anne Brontë discusses the area's geography and history, and the history of the Brontë family.

See also 

Bingley
Bradford
Brontë Waterfall
Halifax, West Yorkshire
High Sunderland Hall
Keighley
Leeds
Lumbfoot
Oakworth
Saltaire
Shibden Hall
Shipley, West Yorkshire
Skipton
Stanbury
Thornton, West Yorkshire

References

External links 

 Bronte Country
 Tourist Information website for the Brontë Country
 Tourist information website for Haworth
 Web news magazine from the Brontë Parsonage Museum
 Website of the Brontë Parsonage Museum in Haworth

Tourist attractions in the City of Bradford
Tourist attractions in Leeds
Brontë family